Nadine Nicole Heimann (born September 15, 1983), known professionally as Nadine Nicole, is an American actress.

Personal life
Nicole was born in Rochester, Michigan, to a German father and a Filipina mother, and is the oldest of three children (sister Lorraine and brother Eric). She attended Fordham University in New York City for two years, then moved to Los Angeles. She is friends with The Young and the Restless co-stars Christel Khalil, Mishael Morgan and Bryton James.

Career
Nicole was initially best-known as one of the primary characters of here TV's LGBT horror series Dante's Cove, where in 2005–07 she played Van, a lesbian holding the supernatural powers of the so-called Tresum. More recently, she played Clarissa Mao (aka Melba Koh) in The Expanse, first as a recurring character (season 3, 2018), then as a guest (season 4, 2019), then as a regular (seasons 5–6, 2020–21).

She has also had several recurring roles. In 2014–2016 she played Gwen on the CBS soap opera The Young and the Restless. In 2014 she appeared as commitment-phobic travel writer Julia in Alex Burunova's award-winning indie film Lonely Planet, shot in Barcelona. In 2017 she was in the Hulu series Casual. In 2019 she appeared in NBC's The Village.

Charity work
In 2012, Nicole started the non-profit organization True Connection.

Filmography

Film

Television

References

External links
 Nadine Nicole Official Website
 

Living people
American television actresses
Fordham University alumni
People from Rochester, Michigan
1983 births
21st-century American women